Běšiny is a municipality and village in Klatovy District in the Plzeň Region of the Czech Republic. It has about 800 inhabitants.

Administrative parts
Villages of Hořákov, Hubenov, Kozí, Rajské and Úloh are administrative parts of Běšiny.

History
The first written mention of Běšiny is from 1379.

Gallery

References

Villages in Klatovy District